Capital punishment is a legal penalty in Tunisia. Despite its legality, no executions have been carried out since 1990. Tunisia is classified as "Abolitionist in Practice."

There were at least 3 new death sentences handed down in Tunisia in 2021. There was believed to have been at least 89 people on death row in Tunisia at the end of 2021.

In September 2020, the President of Tunisia supported reinstating executions in the country, which was criticized by human rights organizations.

References

Tunisia
Law of Tunisia